Sir Matthew David Baggott,   (born 1959) is a retired senior British police officer. He was Chief Constable of the Police Service of Northern Ireland from 2009 to 2014.

Career
Baggott joined the Metropolitan Police in 1978. He moved to West Midlands Police as Assistant Chief Constable in 1998, and was promoted to Deputy Chief Constable in 2001. He was appointed Chief Constable of Leicestershire Constabulary in 2002. 

In September 2009, he succeeded Sir Hugh Orde as Chief Constable of the Police Service of Northern Ireland. In January 2014, it was announced that he would retire from the PSNI in September 2014, having decided that he would not apply to extend his contract. On 5 June 2014, he announced that he would retire earlier than planned; stepping down on 29 June.

He is President of the Christian Police Association.

Honours
Baggott was awarded the Queen's Police Medal (QPM) in the 2004 Birthday Honours, and was appointed Commander of the Order of the British Empire (CBE) in the 2008 New Year Honours 'for services to the Police'. He was knighted in the 2015 New Year Honours for services to policing.

Footnotes

External links
 BBC News Profile: Matt Baggott
 Belfast Telegraph: Matt Baggott appointed new Northern Ireland police chief

1959 births
Living people
Chief Constables of the Police Service of Northern Ireland
Metropolitan Police officers
English recipients of the Queen's Police Medal
Commanders of the Order of the British Empire
West Midlands Police chief officers
Knights Bachelor